Burt Kushner  is an American pediatric ophthalmologist specializing in the diagnosis and treatment of strabismus.   Kushner's contributions include demonstration of improved visual fields of patients following strabismus surgery, elucidation of torsional contribution to patients with diplopia, corticosteroid treatment of periocular capillary hemangioma, and novel hypotheses on the mechanism of "overacting" extraocular muscles.

Training 
Kushner graduated from the Northwestern University School of Medicine  in 1969, and subsequently completed his internship at Evanston Hospital, ophthalmology residency at  University of Wisconsin–Madison Hospital and fellowship in pediatric ophthalmology at Bascom Palmer Eye Institute.

Offices held and honors 
 Director of pediatric ophthalmology and adult strabismus service in the department of ophthalmology at University of Wisconsin–Madison Medical School, Madison, Wisconsin.
 John W. and Helen Doolittle Professor, University of Wisconsin–Madison Medical School
 Founding Editor-in-Chief, Journal of AAPOS
 1992 Heed Foundation Award
 1999 Senior Honor Award, American Association for Pediatric Ophthalmology and Strabismus
 2005 Alfred W. Bressler Prize in Vision Science, awarded by The Jewish Guild for the Blind
 Dr. Kushner presented the first Eugene R. Folk MD Endowed Lecture at the American Academy of Ophthalmology Annual Meeting on October 15, 2005.

Published works (partial list)

See also
pediatric ophthalmology

Feinberg School of Medicine alumni
American ophthalmologists
Pediatric ophthalmologists
American pediatricians
Israeli medical researchers
Year of birth missing (living people)
Living people
Place of birth missing (living people)